The Philippines consists of numerous upland and lowland indigenous ethnolinguistic groups living in the country, with Austronesians making up the overwhelming majority, while full or partial Negritos scattered throughout the archipelago. The highland Austronesians and Negrito have co-existed with their lowland Austronesian kin and neighbor groups for thousands of years in the Philippine archipelago. The primary difference is that they were not absorbed by centuries of Spanish and United States colonization of the Philippines, and in the process have retained their customs and traditions. This is mainly due to the rugged inaccessibility of the mountains and established headhunting and warrior cultures, which discouraged Spanish and American colonizers from coming into contact with the highlanders.

In the interest of clarity, the term indigenous as used in the Philippines refers to ethnolinguistic groups or subgroups that maintain lt of partial isolation, or independence, throughout the colonial era. The term indigenous when applied to the Philippine population can be a deceptive misnomer, connoting alien migrant populations who have over time become the majority ethnolinguistic and cultural group in the land and thereby pushing indigens to the fringes of socio-cultural inclusion, such as in the Americas, Middle East, Australia, or New Zealand. Contrarily, the vast majority of people in the Philippines descend from the same Austronesian ancestral populations indigenous to the archipelago, regardless of cultural, religious, ethnolinguistic or tribal affiliations. (Ethnic groups in the Philippines). In the context of Philippine population, the term is used to refer to a group of people who have retained their culture away from the Christianized lowland culture of Filipinos whose population, though, overwhelmingly Austronesian, had partial mestizos, Insulares and Chinese population, and is characterized by a hybrid of east and west culture.

Culturally-indigenous peoples of northern Philippine highlands can be grouped into the Igorot (comprising many different groups) and singular Bugkalot groups, while the non-Muslim culturally-indigenous groups of mainland Mindanao are collectively called Lumad. Australo-Melanesian groups throughout the archipelago are termed Aeta, Ita, Ati, Dumagat, among others. Numerous culturally-indigenous groups also live outside these two indigenous corridors.

According to the Komisyon sa Wikang Filipino, there are 135 recognized local indigenous Austronesian languages in the Philippines, of which one (Tagalog) is vehicular and each of the remaining 134 is vernacular. There are 134 ethnic groups in the Philippines, the majority of which are indigenous, though much of the overall Philippine population is constituted by only 8-10 lowland ethnic groups.

Overview

Demographics
In the 1990s, there were more than 100 highland tribal groups constituting approximately 3% of the population. The upland tribal groups were a blend in ethnic origin, like those in lowland areas of the country, although the upland tribal groups do not interact nor intermingle with the latter.

Because they displayed a variety of social organization, cultural expression and artistic skills. They showed a high degree of creativity, usually employed to embellish utilitarian objects, such as bowls, baskets, clothing, weapons and spoons. The tribal groups of the Philippines are known for their carved wooden figures, baskets, weaving, pottery and weapons.

Ethnic groups

Northern Philippines

These groups ranged from various Igorot tribes, a group that includes the Bontoc, Ibaloi, Ifugao, Isneg, Kalinga, Kankanaey and Tinguian, who built the Rice Terraces. They also covered a wide spectrum in terms of their integration and acculturation with lowland Christian Filipinos. Native groups such as the Bukidnon in Mindanao, had intermarried with lowlanders for almost a century. Other groups such as the Kalinga in Luzon have remained isolated from lowland influence.

There were several upland groups living in the Cordillera Central of Luzon in 1990. At one time it was employed by lowland Filipinos in a pejorative sense, but in recent years it came to be used with pride by native groups in the mountain region as a positive expression of their ethnic identity. The Ifugao of Ifugao province, the Bontoc, Kalinga, Tinguian, the Kankanaey and Ibaloi were all farmers who constructed the rice terraces for many centuries.

Other mountain peoples of Luzon are the Isnag of the province of Apayao, the Gaddang of the border between Kalinga and Isabela provinces and the Ilongot of Nueva Vizcaya province and Caraballo Mountains all developed hunting and gathering, farming cultivation and headhunting. Other groups such as the Negritos formerly dominated the highlands throughout the islands for thousands of years, but have been reduced to a small population, living in widely scattered locations, primarily along the eastern ranges of the mountains.

Southern Philippines

In the southern Philippines, upland and lowland tribal groups were concentrated on Mindanao and western Visayas, although there are several upland groups such as the Mangyan living in Mindoro. Among the most important groups found on Mindanao are collectively called the Lumad, and includes the Manobo which is a bigger ethnographic group such as the Ata-Manobo and the Matigsalug found in Davao City, Davao del Norte and Bukidnon Province; the Langilan-Manobo in Davao del Norte; the Agusan-Manobo in Agusan del Sur and southern parts of Agusan del Norte; the Pulanguiyon-Manobo of Bukidnon Province; the Ubo-Manobo in southwestern parts of Davao City, and northern parts of North Cotabato Province that is also to include the Arumanen-Manobo of Carmen (N. Cotabato); the Dulangan-Manobo in the Province of Sultan Kudarat; the Talaandig, Higaonon and Bukidnon of Bukidnon province, Bagobo, Mandaya, Mansaka, Tagakaulo in Davao region who inhabited the mountains bordering Davao Gulf; the Kalagan people lives particularly in lowland areas and seashores of Davao del Norte, Compostella Valley, Davao Oriental and some seashores in Davao Del Sur, the Subanon of upland areas in Zamboanga; the Mamanua in the Agusan-Surigao border region; the B'laan, Teduray and Tboli in the region of the Cotabato province, and the Samal.  Samal is synonymous with Luwa'an. Yakan is the indigenous tribe in the hinterlands of Basilan Province.  In the lowland lives the Sama Banguingui tribe while in coastal areas there leave the nomadic Luwa'an. Sulu lowland areas are also home of the Sama Banguingui. The Sama or the Sinama and the Jama Mapun are the indigenous tribes in the province of Tawi-Tawi.

Reservations

The Philippine government succeeded in establishing a number of protected reservations for tribal groups. Highland peoples were expected to speak their native language, dress in their traditional tribal clothing, live in houses constructed of natural materials using traditional architectural designs and celebrate their traditional ceremonies of propitiation of spirits believed to be inhabiting their environment. They are also encouraged to re-establish their traditional authority structure in which, as in indigenous society were governed by chieftains known as Rajah, Datu and Loris.

Contact between primitive and modern ethnic groups usually resulted in weakening or destroying tribal culture without assimilating the indigenous groups into modern society. It seemed doubtful that the shift of the Philippine government policy from assimilation to cultural pluralism could reverse the process. Several Filipino tribes tend to lead to the abandonment of traditional culture because land security makes it easier for tribal members to adopt the economic process of the larger society and facilitates marriage with outsiders.

In the past, the Philippine government bureaus could not preserve tribes as social museum exhibits, but with the aid of various nationwide organizations, they hoped to help the people adapt to modern society without completely losing their ethnic identity.

See also
National Commission on Indigenous Peoples (Philippines)
General
Demographics of the Philippines
Ethnic groups in the Philippines

References

External links
Indigenous Peoples of Mindanao
IWGIA - Indigenous Peoples in the Philippines
Kabunianism and Pneumasomatic Sickness - Cordillera People in the Philippines

 
Ethnic groups in the Philippines